James or Jim Tillman may refer to:

James Calvin Tillman, American former prisoner, exonerated of the crime for which he was imprisoned
James D. Tillman (1841–1916), American Treasury official and politician
James Fount Tillman (1854–1899), American diplomat and politician
James H. Tillman (1869–1911), Lieutenant Governor of South Carolina
James Tillman (baseball) (1919–2009), Negro league baseball player
James Tillman (basketball), American basketball player
Jim K. Tillman (1935–2012), Florida state legislator, rancher and criminologist
Jim Tillman, American musician and member of The U-Men